Nago Ganar was a member of Maharashtra Legislative Council from Nagpur Teacher's Constituency. He was an MLC from 5 December 2010 to 5 December 2016 and got re-elected to the Council on 8 February 2017.

References

Living people
Members of the Maharashtra Legislative Council
Bharatiya Janata Party politicians from Maharashtra
Year of birth missing (living people)